Pithou is a surname. Notable people with the surname include:

 François Pithou (1543–1621), French lawyer and author
 Jean Pithou (1524–1602), French lawyer and author
 Nicolas Pithou (1524–1598), French lawyer and author
 Pierre Pithou (also Petrus Pithoeus) (1539–1596), French lawyer and scholar
 These four were brothers